is a South Korean international school in Suminoe-ku, Osaka, Japan. The school was established in 1946. It is recognised by the government of Osaka Prefecture as a private school under Article 1 of Japan's School Education Act.

See also
Japanese international schools in South Korea:
 Japanese School in Seoul
 Busan Japanese School

References

External links

 Kongo Gakuen 

Elementary schools in Japan
Korean international schools in Japan
International schools in Osaka
High schools in Osaka Prefecture
Educational institutions established in 1946
1946 establishments in Japan